In 2015, Penn State finished 4th in the Big Ten and advanced only to the NCAA Region Semifinal where they were swept by Hawaii. Penn State began the year ranked #1 after having won the national championship the previous two seasons.

Roster

Penn State lost 4 important players from the previous year's championship team. Setter Micha Hancock, middle blocker Nia Grant, libero Dominique Gonzalez and defensive specialist Lacey Fuller all graduated. The four returning starters were Megan Courtney, Ali Frantti, Haleigh Washington and Aiyana Whitney. While Whitney was a returning starter, she played much of the season at middle blocker which was a new position for her in 2015.

Prior to the 2015 season, Whitney was selected to represent Penn State on the Big Ten Volleyball Foreign Tour, where a team composed of players from each conference school competed in Slovenia, Croatia and Italy over the summer.

Coaches

 Russ Rose - Head Coach
 Salima Rockwell - Associate Head Coach
 Stevie Mussie - Assistant coach
 Jesse Tupac - Director of Volleyball Operations
 Shawn Sangrey - Volunteer Assistant

References

Penn State Nittany Lions women's volleyball seasons
2015 NCAA Division I women's volleyball season
2015 in sports in Pennsylvania